Black Shadow may refer to:
Sombra Negra, (Spanish for "Black Shadow") a vigilante group in El Salvador
Vincent Black Shadow, a British motorcycle produced from 1948 to 1955
Black Shadow (Wild Cards), a character from the Wild Cards series
Black Shadow (wrestler), the ring name of Mexican professional wrestler Alejandro Cruz
Black Shadow (Transformers), a Decepticon mercenary